Charles Tuke may refer to:

Charles Tuke (cricketer, born 1857), English cricketer for Middlesex
Charles Tuke (cricketer, born 1858), English cricketer for Hawke's Bay
Charles Tuke (architect) (1843–93)